The Lowville Masonic Temple is a historic Colonial Revival building located in Lowville, New York.  The building was constructed in 1928 as a meeting hall for the local Masonic lodge. 

In 2002 it was sold to the Lewis County Historical Society, and was used as a local history museum. 

It was listed on the National Register of Historic Places on December 19, 2012.

References

Museums in Lewis County, New York
Clubhouses on the National Register of Historic Places in New York (state)
Colonial Revival architecture in New York (state)
Masonic buildings completed in 1928
Former Masonic buildings in New York (state)
Buildings and structures in Lewis County, New York
National Register of Historic Places in Lewis County, New York
History museums in New York (state)